Next Magazine may refer to:
Next Magazine (Hong Kong and Taiwan), formerly published news magazines, now only published in digital format in Hong Kong
Next Magazine (New York City), an LGBT nightlife magazine
Next Magazine (Santa Monica), a music industry trade publication